The enzyme fumonisin B1 esterase (EC 3.1.1.87, fumD (gene); systematic name fumonisin B1 acylhydrolase) catalyses the reaction 

 fumonisin B1 + 2 H2O  aminopentol + 2 propane-1,2,3-tricarboxylate

The enzyme is involved in degradation of fumonisin B1.

References

External links 
 

EC 3.1.1